Marie Bové is a French politician and a member of The Greens-Europe Écologie. She is also the daughter of José Bové, Member of the European Parliament.

She was The Greens-Europe Écologie's candidate in Aquitaine for the 2010 regional elections.

References

 Marie Bové militante dès le berceaux in VSD

Year of birth missing (living people)
Living people
French politicians